The Discworld Mapp is an atlas that contains a large, fold out map of the Discworld fictional world, drawn by Stephen Player to the directions of Terry Pratchett and Stephen Briggs. It also contains a short booklet relating the adventures and explorers of the Disc and their discoveries.

It was originally conceived as the second in a series of three maps, along with The Streets of Ankh-Morpork and A Tourist Guide to Lancre. For this work, Briggs became known as the "cartographer of Discworld." A fourth atlas, Death's Domain, was added to the series.

After its publication, Pratchett was surprised to learn that British bookshops were displaying it in their nonfiction sections because, they argued, it was a real map, though of a fictional place.

References
Notes

Bibliography

 Clute, John and John Grant. The Encyclopedia of Fantasy. New York: St Martin's Press, 1997.  / London: Orbit Books, 1997. .

External links
 Discworld & Pratchett Wiki
 

Mapp
Fictional atlases
Fictional maps
Discworld locations
Corgi books
1995 books